Atlantic Boulevard may refer to:

Atlantic Boulevard (Jacksonville), consisting of parts of U.S. Route 90 and Florida State Road 10
Atlantic Boulevard (Los Angeles County)
Atlantic Boulevard (Broward County), which carries County Road 814 and Florida State Road 814

See also
Atlantic Avenue (disambiguation)

Boulevards in the United States